The 2022 Copa do Brasil third round was the third round of the 2022 Copa do Brasil football competition. It was played from 19 April to 31 May 2022. A total of 32 teams competed in the third round to decide 16 places in the final rounds of the 2022 Copa do Brasil.

Draw
The draw for the third round was held on 28 March 2022, 15:00 at CBF headquarters in Rio de Janeiro. In a first draw, the 32 teams, seeded by their CBF ranking, were drawn into 16 ties. The home and away teams of each leg were decided in a second draw. CBF ranking is shown in parentheses.

Format
In the third round, each tie was played on a home-and-away two-legged basis. If the aggregate score was level, the second-leg match would go straight to the penalty shoot-out to determine the winners.

Matches
All times are Brasília time, BRT (UTC−3)

|}

Match 61

Tied 2–2 on aggregate, Goiás won on penalties and advanced to the round of 16.

Match 62

Tied 1–1 on aggregate, Atlético Goianiense won on penalties and advanced to the round of 16.

Match 63

Ceará won 4–0 on aggregate and advanced to the round of 16.

Match 64

Fluminense won 5–2 on aggregate and advanced to the round of 16.

Match 65

Tied 1–1 on aggregate, Bahia won on penalties and advanced to the round of 16.

Match 66

São Paulo won 4–2 on aggregate and advanced to the round of 16.

Match 67

Corinthians won 3–1 on aggregate and advanced to the round of 16.

Match 68

Botafogo won 6–0 on aggregate and advanced to the round of 16.

Match 69

Atlético Mineiro won 4–0 on aggregate and advanced to the round of 16.

Match 70

Fortaleza won 4–0 on aggregate and advanced to the round of 16.

Match 71

Athletico Paranaense won 9–2 on aggregate and advanced to the round of 16.

Match 72

Palmeiras won 4–2 on aggregate and advanced to the round of 16.

Match 73

América Mineiro won 5–0 on aggregate and advanced to the round of 16.

Match 74

Tied 2–2 on aggregate, Cruzeiro won on penalties and advanced to the round of 16.

Match 75

Flamengo won 4–1 on aggregate and advanced to the round of 16.

Match 76

Santos won 3–1 on aggregate and advanced to the round of 16.

References

2022 in Brazilian football